Philip Tingley Rogers (February 14, 1908 – June 19, 1961) was a sailor from Canada. He represented his country at the 1932 Summer Olympics in Los Angeles and earned a bronze medal in the 6 metre class.

Sources
 

1908 births
1961 deaths
Sportspeople from Vancouver
Canadian male sailors (sport)
Olympic sailors of Canada
Sailors at the 1932 Summer Olympics – 6 Metre
Medalists at the 1932 Summer Olympics
Olympic bronze medalists for Canada
Olympic medalists in sailing